Prebuild may refer to:

Prebuild, a technique used for pipelines such as Northern Pipeline Agency Canada and Alaska gas pipeline
Prebuild, a method for Inventory optimization
Prebuild (album), a 2004 album by 808 State
"Prebuild", a track from Richie Hawtin album DE9: Transitions